Luperosaurus angliit is a species of gecko. It is endemic to Luzon in the Philippines.

References

Luperosaurus
Reptiles described in 2011
Endemic fauna of the Philippines
Reptiles of the Philippines
Fauna of Luzon